BC Vytis is a professional team based in Šakiai, Lithuania that currently plays in National Basketball League. In 2015, the club fans selected new club name and logo.

Club achievements
 2013–14 season: NKL Round of 16
 2014–15 season: NKL Round of 16
 2015–16 season: NKL Quarterfinals
 2016–17 season: NKL Third place
 2017–18 season: NKL Third place
 2018-19 season: NKL Runner-Up

Team roster

Notable players and coaches
  Dovydas Redikas
  Ignas Vaitkus
  Gytis Radzevičius
  Dominykas Domarkas
  Darius Maskoliūnas
  Aurimas Jasilionis

Sakiai
Šakiai
Basketball teams established in 2005
2005 establishments in Lithuania
National Basketball League (Lithuania) teams